Chromis cinerascens, the green puller, is a diurnal species of damselfish belonging to the genus Chromis. It can be found in the Indo-West Pacific region, in Sri Lanka, Maldives, the Andaman Sea, Malaysia, Indonesia, Vietnam, the Philippines, East Timor, Brunei Darussalam, North-western Australia, Hong Kong and Taiwan. It inhabits coral reefs. It is oviparous, and the males of the species guard and aerate the eggs.

References

cinerascens
Fish of the Pacific Ocean
Fish described in 1830
Taxa named by Georges Cuvier
Fish of the Indian Ocean